Oscar Urbina Ortega (born 13 April 1947) is a Colombian prelate of the Roman Catholic Church. He is the second and current Archbishop of Villavicencio.

Biography
Oscar Urbina Ortega was born in Arboledas, and ordained to the priesthood by Archbishop Aníbal Muñoz Duque on 30 November 1973. From 1986 to 1994 he was Rector of the Major Seminary of Bogotá, the main seminary of the Archdiocese of Bogotá.

On March 8, 1996, he was appointed Auxiliary Bishop of Bogotá and Titular Bishop of Forconium by Pope John Paul II. He received his episcopal consecration on the following 13 April from Archbishop Pedro Rubiano Sáenz, with Archbishops Paolo Romeo and Tarcisio Bertone, SDB, serving as co-consecrators. Urbina was later named Bishop of Cúcuta on 9 November 1999.

Pope Benedict XVI later named him the second Archbishop of Villavicencio on 30 November 2007, the thirty-fourth anniversary of his priestly ordination. Urbina succeeded José Ruiz Arenas, who was made a bishop in the same ceremony as the former in 1996, and was formally installed as Archbishop on 25 January 2008.

References

External links

Catholic-Hierarchy

1947 births
Living people
20th-century Roman Catholic bishops in Colombia
21st-century Roman Catholic archbishops in Colombia
Bishops appointed by Pope Benedict XVI
Bishops appointed by Pope John Paul II
People from Norte de Santander Department
Major Seminary of Bogotá alumni
Academic staff of the Major Seminary of Bogotá
Roman Catholic bishops of Cúcuta